Seven Lakes Drive is a north–south parkway located in the Hudson Valley region of New York in the United States. It extends for just under  on a northeast–southwest alignment from an intersection with New York State Route 17 (NY 17) in the village of Sloatsburg to a junction with U.S. Route 9W (US 9W) and US 202 south of the Bear Mountain Bridge in the town of Stony Point. Most of the highway is located in either Harriman or Bear Mountain state parks, except for a small stretch near its western end. Ownership of Seven Lakes Drive is split between three entities, two of which are also responsible for maintenance of the road.

Sections of Seven Lakes Drive and several other roads in the park system (Tiorati Brook Road, Lake Welch Drive, and Perkins Memorial Drive), are closed for the winter from December through March.

Route description

As its name implies, Seven Lakes Drive passes by seven lakes located at various points along the road. From south to north, the lakes are Lake Sebago and Lake Kanawauke in the towns of Haverstraw and Tuxedo; Lake Skannatati and Lake Askoti in Tuxedo; Lake Tiorati in Tuxedo and Woodbury; Silver Mine Lake in Woodbury; and Queensboro Lake in Highlands.

The highway is not owned by a single entity; instead, the New York State Department of Transportation (NYSDOT), the Palisades Interstate Park Commission (PIPC), and the village of Sloatsburg all own different parts of the road. In Sloatsburg, the westernmost  from NY 17 to Waldron Terrace is state-owned and maintained as New York State Route 981G (NY 981G). The remaining  is owned by PIPC and maintained by NYSDOT as New York State Route 987E (NY 987E). The NY 981G and NY 987E designations are reference routes and are unsigned.

Southern Rockland County
Seven Lakes Drive begins at an intersection with NY 17 in the village of Sloatsburg. It heads northeast through the community, crossing over the Ramapo River and intersecting a handful of residential village streets before passing under the New York State Thruway (Interstate 87). The highway continues to run past homes on the opposite side of the Thruway overpass, where it intersects Johnsontown Road, a road that parallels Seven Lakes Drive for  before terminating at a dead end adjacent to the parkway. Seven Lakes Drive meets a short, unnamed connector to Johnsontown Road just  later, at which point the road begins to pass through undeveloped wooded areas on its way across Stony Brook and into Harriman State Park.

Just east of the Stony Brook bridge, the Pine Meadow Trail begins on the southeast side of the highway. The road loosely parallels Stony Brook as it heads deeper into the park and serves the Reeves Meadow Visitor Center. The center is also a trailhead for the Reeves Brook Trail, with the Pine Meadow Trail passing the facility on its southeast side. Past the visitor center, the parallel alignments of Seven Lakes Drive and Johnsontown Road come to an end as the latter ends at a cul-de-sac adjacent to the former. The dead end serves as the trailhead for two hiking trails: the Blue Disc Trail, which starts just before the cul-de-sac; and the White Bar Trail, which begins at the cul-de-sac's northern end. Not far from this point, the Kakiat Trail crosses Seven Lakes Drive on its way toward Kakiat County Park.

Continuing on, Seven Lakes Drive begins to parallel the White Bar Trail as both head to the northeast through the rugged, forested terrain of the park. Eventually, the White Bar Trail splits from the parkway and proceeds to the north while Seven Lakes Drive remains on a generally northeasterly track. Stony Brook reaches its source at Lake Sebago, the first of the seven lakes the road passes, where the Tuxedo–Mount Ivy Trail briefly follows the parkway before turning off to the east. Past the lake, Seven Lakes Drive makes a slight turn to the north before intersecting with the Lake Welch Parkway by way of an elongated traffic circle. The road reverts to a northeasterly routing past the junction, briefly paralleling the Rockland–Orange county line as it runs past Lake Kanawauke's southeastern edge. Seven Lakes Drive crosses the county line near the lake's midpoint.

Orange and northern Rockland counties

The parkway continues to follow Lake Kanawauke to Kanawauke Circle, where it intersects with County Route 106 (CR 106), formerly part of NY 210. Not far from the junction, Seven Lakes Drive passes two more lakes, Lake Skannatati to the west and Lake Askoti to the east, as it slowly curves to the north. The highway crosses the Long Path near Lake Skannatati and connects to a parking area near Lake Askoti. Another trail, the Red Cross Trail, traverses Seven Lakes Drive at the northern end of Lake Askoti. About a half-mile (0.8 km) north of Lake Askoti is Lake Tiorati, located along the eastern edge of the road. As the highway runs past the lake, it turns back to the northeast and eventually reaches Tiorati Circle at the northern tip of the lake. The junction serves as the east end of Arden Valley Road, the west end of Tiorati Brook Road, and the trailhead of the Lake Tiorati Trail.

Seven Lakes Drive continues northeast from the circle, intersecting with several trails, including the Ramapo–Dunderberg Trail and the Appalachian Trail. A crossing of the Menomine Trail follows as the parkway turns to the east. The Menomine Trail follows Seven Lakes Drive for a short distance to nearby Silver Mine Lake on the south edge of the road. The Silver Mine Ski Road, a trail paralleling most of the lake, meets the parkway at the eastern lakeshore. Here, Seven Lakes Drive directly intersects US 6 and indirectly connects to the nearby Palisades Interstate Parkway (PIP) by way of ramps leading away from the circle. Seven Lakes Drive follows US 6 through the circle, joining the route as both roads merge onto the PIP.

The overlap with both US 6 and the PIP lasts for just  as Seven Lakes Drive leaves the PIP at the next junction, a trumpet interchange southwest of Bear Mountain. Seven Lakes Drive heads eastward from the interchange, running along the southern base of the large mountain as it intersects with several trails and passes seamlessly into the adjacent Bear Mountain State Park. Just east of the park boundary, the highway crosses the county line once again, re-entering Rockland County near its northernmost point. At the southeastern edge of Bear Mountain, Seven Lakes Drive begins to descend a series of switchbacks as it enters the Hudson River valley. The road gradually makes its way to the western edge of the river, where it ends at an intersection with US 9W and US 202 due east of Bear Mountain's and just south of the Bear Mountain Bridge.

History

The origins of Seven Lakes Drive date as far back as the 1920s, by which time the basis for the modern road was in place from the southern tip of Lake Kanawauke to the banks of the Hudson River. At its south end, the highway connected to Johnstown Road, which continued southwest to Sloatsburg and northeast to Lake Welch. The section of Johnstown Road southwest of this point was also known as Stony Brook Drive, named for its proximity to Stony Brook, a tributary of the Ramapo River. Stony Brook and Seven Lakes drives were renamed Seven Lakes Parkway . Although the road's name has since reverted to Seven Lakes Drive, the Seven Lakes Parkway name is still used by NYSDOT for the section owned by PIPC and designated NY 987E.

In 1960, the state of New York made plans to construct a  extension of Seven Lakes Drive leading southwest from Kanawauke Circle to Sloatsburg. As planned, it would be built in the then-Stony Brook Drive corridor as a straighter alternative to the original highway. The new road was completed in 1962, lessening or eliminating several curves that existed in the old route. Most of what was originally Stony Brook Drive was dismantled as part of the route's construction; however, a  section near Sloatsburg was left intact and renamed Johnsontown Road. The road only connects to Seven Lakes Drive at its west end; the east end of the highway is at a cul-de-sac adjacent to where Seven Lakes Drive merges into Stony Brook Drive's old right-of-way. The  portion of Johnsontown Road outside of the Sloatsburg village limits is now maintained by Rockland County as CR 97.

Major intersections

See also

List of county routes in Rockland County, New York (76–118A)

References

External links

Parkways in New York (state)
Transportation in Rockland County, New York
Transportation in Orange County, New York
Bear Mountain State Park
Harriman State Park (New York)